Ahaetulla prasina is a species of snake in the family Colubridae  to southern Asia. Its common names include Asian vine snake, Boie's whip snake, Gunther's whip snake, Oriental whip snake, Judgmental Shoelace  (Thai: งูเขียวหัวจิ้งจก) .

Description

The body form is extremely slender with a long, pointed, projecting snout which is rather more than twice as long as the eye. Adult colouration varies from light brown to dull yellow-green and often a startling fluorescent green.

The type and number of scales is used to identify the snakes.  In this species the internasals are usually in contact with the labial or lip scales. There are one to four small loreals between the prefrontal and the labial scales. The frontal is as long as its distance from the end of the snout or a little longer and a little longer than the parietal scales. There is one preocular scale in front of the eye, which is in contact with the frontal scale.  There two postocular scales (behind the eyes). The temporal scales come in patterns of 2+2 or 3+3, rarely 1+2. Of the upper labial scales, the ninth, fourth, fifth, and sixth enter the eye while the 4 lower labials are in contact with the anterior chin-shields, which are shorter than the posterior chin-shields. The scales in 15 rows and are usually faintly keeled on the sacral region. 
There are 203-234 Ventral scales which are anal divided.  There are 167 to 203 subcaudals which are bright green, pale olive, or grey-brown, with a yellow line along each side of the lower parts. The interstitial skin of the neck is black and white.

Adults may attain 1.8 m (6 feet) in total length, with a tail 0.6 m (2 feet) long.

Its appearance is very much like those of South American vine snakes. It is a rear-fanged species and is mildly venomous but is not considered a threat to humans.

Distribution
This snake has a wide distribution in Asia, where it occurs in Bangladesh, Bhutan, Brunei, Burma, Cambodia, China, India, Indonesia, Laos, Malaysia, Philippines, Singapore, Thailand, and Vietnam.

Diet
The Asian vine snake feeds on small reptiles and amphibians, particularly lizards and tree frogs.

In captivity
In recent years, it has entered the pet trade and has become quite popular among hobbyists.

Subspecies
Four subspecies are recognized, including the nominate race.

Ahaetulla prasina medioxima Lazell, 2002
Ahaetulla prasina preocularis (Taylor, 1922): Philippine Islands, including Sulu Archipelago, Panay, Luzon.
Ahaetulla prasina prasina (Boie, 1827)
Ahaetulla prasina suluensis Gaulke, 1994: Philippine Islands, Sulu Archipelago

Gallery

Notes

References 
 Boulenger, G.A. 1897 List of the reptiles and batrachians collected by Mr. Alfred Everett in Lombok, Flores, Sumba and Saru, with descriptions of new species.Ann. Mag. Nat. Hist. (6) 19: 503-509
 Shaw, G. 1802 General Zoology, or Systematic Natural History. Vol.3, part 1 + 2. G. Kearsley, Thomas Davison, London: 313-615

External links 

 

Ahaetulla
Snakes of Vietnam
Snakes of Asia
Reptiles of Bangladesh
Reptiles of Bhutan
Reptiles of Brunei
Reptiles of Cambodia
Snakes of China
Reptiles of Hong Kong
Reptiles of India
Reptiles of Indonesia
Reptiles of Laos
Reptiles of Malaysia
Reptiles of Myanmar
Reptiles of the Philippines
Reptiles of Singapore
Reptiles of Thailand
Reptiles of Vietnam
Reptiles of Borneo
Reptiles of Sulawesi
Fauna of Sumatra
Reptiles described in 1827
Taxa named by Friedrich Boie